The Order of the Coif  is an honor society for United States law school graduates. The name is a reference to the ancient English order of advocates, the serjeants-at-law, whose courtroom attire included a coif—a white lawn or silk skullcap, which came to be represented by a round piece of white lace worn on top of the advocate's wig. A student at an American law school who earns a Juris Doctor degree and graduates in the top 10 percent of their class is eligible for membership if the student's law school has a chapter of the Order. The Order of the Coif honor society was founded in 1902 at the University of Illinois College of Law.

Membership
According to the organization's constitution, "The purpose of The Order is to encourage excellence in legal education by fostering a spirit of careful study, recognizing those who as law students attained a high grade of scholarship, and honoring those who as lawyers, judges and teachers attained high distinction for their scholarly or professional accomplishments."

The exact induction process varies by law school, but students are generally notified of their membership after the final class ranks at their schools are announced. A new member receives a certificate of membership, a badge of membership for wear during academic ceremonies, a Coif key, and in some cases an actual coif or a representation of one.

The basic requirement for membership is ranking in the top 10% of a member school's graduating class. If a member law school graduates fewer than 30 students, it may induct its top three students. A school can decide not to allow an otherwise eligible student to receive the honor, and may impose additional requirements for membership beyond the organization's national requirement of being in the top 10% of the class.

Each member school may also induct a faculty member and one honorary member each year. The national organization's executive committee may also elect a limited number of honorary members. Those chosen for honorary membership are usually U.S. Supreme Court justices and other preeminent members of the legal profession.

History

The University of Illinois College of Law established the first [American] Order of the Coif chapter in 1902.

The symbolism of the Order of the Coif is far older, having evolved from legal traditions of the Middle Ages in England. The Coif itself originated as a tight-fitting headpiece once used by both men and women.  A version of this, in form a close-fitting hood that covered all but the face, was adopted as a symbol for those barristers who had been recognized as serjeants-at-law, and thus formed the narrow pool of legal practitioners who could be appointed judges of the Court of Common Pleas or, later, of the King's Bench. With this distinctive apparel, the serjeants-at-law became known as "serjeants of the coif" and their group within society as the original Order of the Coif; this predecessor inspired the name and markings of the American Order, although beyond inspiration there is no legal connection between the two. White wigs were so often sewn onto the coif that their usage became conjoined.

One of the earliest known (English) serjeants of the coif was a man named Geofrey Ridel, named so in the year 1117.  The early writer, Geoffrey Chaucer made mention of Serjeants at Law in the preface to his novel, The Canterbury Tales.  Through the 15th, 16th and 17th Centuries, important English jurists were so recognized:  Bacon, Blackburn, Blackstone, Campbell, Cavendish, Coke, Coleridge, Fortesque, Glanville, and Littleton, may be the best known. But in the 18th century, rumblings of dissatisfaction in this arrangement grew. The English Order's privileged hold on the court was finally ended when a Crown Warrant was issued 1839 which commanded Common Pleas to permit “gentlemen of the bar generally” be allowed to practice before it. Objections were litigated briefly, but by the following year the matter had been settled with the power of the Order broken.  Its last meeting was held in 1877.

The wig and coif remain standard courtroom attire in England and Commonwealth countries today.

At the time of the demise of the English Order, several leading American law schools had already seen development of honors fraternities to recognize scholarship and distinction within the ranks of Juris Doctors in the United States. One of these, at the University of Illinois was originally named Theta Kappa Nu. It inspired several additional chapters at Nebraska, Missouri and Wisconsin.  A local legal honor society had formed in 1907 at Northwestern University, adopting the name Order of the Coif, but three years later, in 1910, would accept a charter from Theta Kappa Nu. Even with this charter the Northwestern group apparently retained use of the earlier name, which was one of the factors which necessitated a discussion and eventual negotiation of a merger, and not just an absorption (see History). Also in 1910 chapters at Iowa and Michigan were formed. Rapid expansion and divergent practices at these early schools led to calls for a national convention.  At this meeting, in 1911, it was determined to adopt the original name of the Northwestern group, the Order of the Coif, along with a revised Constitution which was fully ratified in 1912.  Thus the American Order of the Coif dates to its earliest group, at Illinois, from 1902, and adopted its name from both the Northwestern group and its institutional inspiration, the English Order.

Chapters
, 87 of 203 United States law schools accredited by the American Bar Association to award the J.D. degree had Order of the Coif chapters. In that year, all but five of the top fifty law schools, as ranked by U.S. News & World Report, were member schools.  The others, Boston University School of Law, Columbia Law School, Harvard Law School, George Mason University School of Law, and Notre Dame Law School, have never applied for a chapter. Notre Dame and Columbia are ineligible because they do not rank the top 10% of their graduating class by grade point average, which the order's constitution requires.

For a law school to establish a chapter, the school must apply for a charter. If the organization's executive committee determines, after considering the law school's written submissions and its own investigation (which may include an examination of the school by a visitation team), that the applicant merits a chapter, it will submit the application for a vote by the existing chapters. A charter for a new chapter requires approval by 80% of the existing chapters.

Criteria considered when a law school applies for a chapter of the Order include: 
 American Bar Association and Association of American Law Schools approval; 
 At least ten years of existence as a law school; 
 Affiliation with a university; 
 If a part-time J.D. program exists, the part-time program must offer students and faculty affiliated with the part-time program the same scholarship opportunities as all other students and faculty; 
 A stimulating intellectual environment for the study of law; 
 Commitment of the university and law school administration to quality legal education; 
 Faculty scholarship and institutional support for same; 
 A diverse educational program; 
 A diverse student body with strong academic credentials; 
 A law library that will support and encourage research activity; and,
 Appropriate physical facilities.

A law school can also be removed from the Order if a two-thirds of member schools agree to bring the matter to a vote and four-fifths (excluding the school in question) then vote to remove the school.

The list of chapters is maintained on the Order's website.

See also 
 The Order of Barristers (honor society, law; litigation)
 Phi Delta Phi (honor society, law; was a professional fraternity)
 Alpha Phi Sigma (honor society, criminal justice)
 Lambda Epsilon Chi (honor society, paralegal)
 Delta Theta Phi (professional fraternity, law)
 Gamma Eta Gamma (professional fraternity, law)
 Phi Alpha Delta (professional fraternity, law)
 Phi Beta Gamma (professional fraternity, law)
 Phi Delta Delta (professional fraternity, women, law)
 Sigma Delta Kappa (professional fraternity, law)
 Kappa Alpha Pi (professional) (professional fraternity, pre-law)
 Kappa Beta Pi (originally women's professional fraternity, now legal association, law)
 Nu Beta Epsilon (Jewish, originally men's professional fraternity, law, dormant?)

References

Further reading
Michael Herz, Coif Comes to Cardozo,  (Spring 1999) (includes information on the order's history).
Frank R. Strong, Order of the Coif: English Antecedents and American Adaptation, 63 A.B.A. J. 1725-1727 (1977).

External links

Honor societies
Legal organizations based in the United States
Legal education in the United States
Educational organizations based in the United States
Student organizations established in 1902
Former members of Association of College Honor Societies
1902 establishments in Illinois